Lahari Recording Company is an Indian music company based in Bangalore. It owns a music label called "Lahari Music" also a film production company called "Lahari Films LLP". They later ventured into construction under the name of HomEquity India Private Limited brand.

History 
The company was established in 1974 by Manohar Naidu with a seed capital of Rs.500. Over the last three decades it has acquired Premaloka in Kannada, Roja, Dalapathi in Tamil and Telugu and Malayalam languages. In addition to film songs, Lahari music also produces sugam sangeetha, folk, classical and devotional albums.

In 2015, Lahari made a deal with major music distributor T-Series which allowed T-Series to take over the role of marketing Lahari Music's entire catalogue on YouTube and television. Lahari Music continues to operate in music acquisition, and delivery of content to streaming and radio.

Filmography

Kannada

Malayalam

Telugu

Tamil

Lahari Films

References

1974 establishments in Karnataka
Companies based in Bangalore
Indian record labels
Indian music record labels
Music companies of India